Poltavka may refer to:
Poltavka, name of Aranlı, Imishli, a village in Azerbaijan, until 1999
Poltavka, Russia, several inhabited localities in Russia
Poltavka culture, an early to middle Bronze Age archaeological culture of the middle Volga